The women's high jump at the 2012 IAAF World Indoor Championships took place March 9 and 10 at the Ataköy Athletics Arena.

Medalists

Records

Qualification standards

Schedule

Results

Qualification

Qualification standard: 1.95 m (Q) or at least best 8 qualified (q).  20 athletes from 17 countries participated.  One athlete did not start the competition  The qualification round started at 09:37 and ended at 11:46.

Final

8 athletes from 8 countries participated.  The final started at 18:16 and ended at 19:24.

References

High Jump
High jump at the World Athletics Indoor Championships
2012 in women's athletics